Lal Darja (English language: The Red Door) is a 1997 Bengali allegorical drama film about a Kolkata dentist Dr. Nabin Dutta who fears becoming a cripple. Directed and written by Buddhadev Dasgupta, he film won the Golden Lotus Award for Best Film at the Indian National Film Awards.

Plot
Nabin Dutta (Subhendu Chattopadhyay) was a 47-year-old dentist. He had a son Kushal who was studying in Darjeeling. His wife was not satisfied with him and wanted to be separated. Nabin thought he had some acute disease, but it was nothing serious. Every moment Nabin felt a lack of satisfaction.

He compared his situation with his driver Dinu who had two wives, Sukhi (Nandini Maliya) and Maloti (Indrani Haldar). Dinu's wives were satisfied with him and they had no complaints about Dinu. Nabin tried to understand himself. Most of the time he thought about his childhood in Cherrapunji and the red coloured gate which he thought obeyed him. His mother said that the gate had a huge tolerance and Nabin compared himself with the red coloured gate. Ultimately, after departing from his wife and son, he raised his tolerance to a maximum stage and started to live alone with himself.

Cast
 Champa
 Subhendu Chatterjee as Nabin Dutta
 Raisul Islam
 Indrani Haldar as Maloti
 Biplab Chatterjee
 Haradhan Bandopadhyay

References

External links
 

1997 films
Bengali-language Indian films
1997 drama films
Films directed by Buddhadeb Dasgupta
Best Feature Film National Film Award winners
1990s Bengali-language films